Mario Di Stazio (born 25 May 1951 in Edolo) is an Italian retired slalom canoeist who competed from the late 1960s to the mid-1970s. He finished 17th in the K-1 event at the 1972 Summer Olympics in Munich.

References
Sports-reference.com profile

External links

1951 births
Canoeists at the 1972 Summer Olympics
Italian male canoeists
Living people
Olympic canoeists of Italy
Sportspeople from the Province of Brescia